Batchoy, alternatively spelled batsoy, is a Filipino noodle soup of pork offal, crushed pork cracklings, chicken stock, beef loin and round noodles. The popular variant, the La Paz Batchoy, traces its roots to the district of La Paz, Iloilo City in the Philippines.

Origin
The origin of the La Paz Batchoy is unclear with several accounts claiming credit for the dish:
 Inggo's Batchoy opened his Batchoy stall in 1922 and literally the first Batchoy shop in La Paz, Iloilo City, 16 years Ahead than Deco's La Paz Batchoy Shop, which opened in 1938
The dish was concocted by Federico Guilergan Sr. in 1938 in Iloilo His recipe called for a mixture of broth, noodles, beef and pork. The soup later evolved into its present form which has become Iloilo City's most popular dish. Federico Guillergan, Jr., the son of the soup's inventor, states that his father at first jokingly called the dish "bats" when asked for its name. Later, he added "choy", from the vegetable dish chop suey.
Ted's Oldtimer Lapaz Batchoy  by Teodorico "Ted" Lepura opened his first batchoy shop at the La Paz Public Market in 1945. Run by Lepura, his wife and their children, the shop sold the original La Paz batchoy at that time priced at 20 centavos per bowl. In the 1930s, as a teenager, Lepura learned the basics of making La Paz batchoy while working for a Chinese merchant, and eventually concocted his own version of the dish.
Other sources state that the dish originated from the Chinese community in La Paz, since the etymology of the name "Batchoy" likely comes from the Hokkien Chinese term, meaning meat soup.

Preparation
Ingredients of La Paz Batchoy include pork offal (liver, spleen, kidneys and heart) crushed pork cracklings, beef loin, shrimp broth, and round egg noodles or miki.

Oil is heated in a stock-pot. The pork organs, shrimp, chicken and beef are stir-fried for about a minute. Soy sauce is then added. The shrimp  is then added and left to simmer for a few minutes. This broth is then added to a bowl of noodles and topped with leeks, pork cracklings (chicharon) and sometimes a raw egg is cracked on top. Most Filipinos eat the soup using spoon and fork. The soup is generally consumed first, the liquid broth rounds out the meal. Diners are encouraged to ask for a second, third, or even a fourth helping of kaldo (Hiligaynon, "broth").

Regional Varieties
The province of Quezon has a variation of the Batsoy Tagalog called Bombay or Bumbay which derives its name from the similarity of the tied banana-leaf pouch to the appearance of the turban worn by the Sikhs. The dish consists of finely chopped and seasoned pork offal wrapped in banana leaf and then boiled in water. The dish is served with its cooking broth.

See also
 Pancit Molo
 Kinalas
 Cuisine of the Philippines
 Ginataan
 List of soups
 Soto - Indonesian soups, most of which made with chicken or beef.
 Ramen - a similar dish from Japan.

References

Philippine soups
Philippine cuisine
Philippine noodle dishes
Philippine pork dishes
Culture of Iloilo
Noodle soups
Visayan cuisine